Christos Theophilou  (born 30 April 1980 in Limassol) is a Cypriot footballer who plays for Aris Limassol as a right defender.

Career
Theophilou started his career at Apollon's Academy and he has been the captain of Apollon. On 1 June 2010 he signed a 2-year contract with AEK Larnaca. A year later he returned to Apollon. In July 2012, he signed a two year contract with 2011-2012 Champions AEL Limassol. Two years later, he joined Aris Limassol, which competes in Cypriot Second Division, in order to assist the club's return to Cypriot First Division. By joining Aris Limassol, became one of the players that have played for three main Limassol teams.

External links
 

1980 births
Living people
Apollon Limassol FC players
AEK Larnaca FC players
AEL Limassol players
Cypriot footballers
Cyprus international footballers
Cypriot First Division players
Association football midfielders
Sportspeople from Limassol